Brian Keith Comer (born 1985) is a Canadian politician, who was elected to the Nova Scotia House of Assembly in a by-election on September 3, 2019. He represents the electoral district of Sydney River-Mira-Louisbourg as a member of the Progressive Conservative Association of Nova Scotia caucus.

On August 31, 2021, Comer was made Minister of Communications Nova Scotia, as well as Minister responsible for Youth and Mental Health and Addictions.

Prior to his election to the legislature, Comer worked as mental health and addictions nurse at the Cape Breton Regional Hospital.

Electoral record

References

Living people
Progressive Conservative Association of Nova Scotia MLAs
Members of the Executive Council of Nova Scotia
People from the Cape Breton Regional Municipality
Place of birth missing (living people)
21st-century Canadian politicians
Canadian nurses
1985 births
Male nurses